Evita is a 1996 American musical drama film based on Tim Rice and Andrew Lloyd Webber's musical of the same name about First Lady of Argentina, Eva Perón. Directed by Alan Parker and written by Parker and Oliver Stone, the film starred Madonna, Antonio Banderas, and Jonathan Pryce in the leading roles of Eva, Ché and Juan Perón respectively. Rice and Webber composed the film's musical score, while Darius Khondji was the cinematographer. Vincent Paterson created the choreography for the film and Gerry Hambling was responsible for editing. Penny Rose designed and created the period costumes for the film, and Brian Morris was the set designer.

Made on a budget of $56 million (equivalent to $ million in ), Evita was released on December 25, 1996, and grossed over $141 million (equivalent to $ million in ) worldwide. Rotten Tomatoes, a review aggregator, surveyed 37 reviews and judged 62% to be positive. The film garnered awards and nominations in several categories and has won 19 awards from 40 nominations, with particular recognition for Madonna, Parker, Rice, Webber, and the song "You Must Love Me" from the film.

At the 69th ceremony of the Academy Awards, Evita was nominated in five categories, and went on to win Best Original Song for "You Must Love Me" (for Rice and Webber). The song won the same category at the 54th Golden Globe Awards and was nominated in four other categories, including Best Motion Picture – Musical or Comedy and Best Actress – Motion Picture Comedy or Musical, with the latter won by Madonna. She was also listed by the Guinness World Records under the category of Most Costume Changes in a Film—she had 85 costume changes in total, and wore 39 hats, 45 pairs of shoes, 56 pairs of earrings and 42 hair designs. Evita garnered eight nominations at the 50th British Academy Film Awards ceremony, but did not win any of them. For his direction, Parker earned the European Silver Ribbon award at the Italian National Syndicate of Film Journalists. The National Board of Review listed Evita as one of their Top Ten Films for 1996 ranking it at number four. It won the Best Film trophy at the 1st Golden Satellite Awards.

Accolades

See also
 1996 in film

Notes

References

External links
 

Lists of accolades by film